Elstree School is an English preparatory school for children aged 3–13 at Woolhampton House in Woolhampton, near Newbury in the English county of Berkshire. The school is co-educational and is in the village of Southampton.

History

1848–1938 in Elstree, Hertfordshire
As its name suggests, the school was founded in 1848 in Elstree, Hertfordshire, at Hill House on Elstree Hill, an 18th-century Grade II Listed Building. Today the building is used as Bupa Care Centre.

Since 1938 in Woolhampton, Berkshire
With the approach of the outbreak of the Second World War, in 1938, Elstree School was evacuated to Woolhampton House in the Berkshire village of Woolhampton, and has remained there ever since.

The building

Woolhampton House is a 17th-century Grade II* Listed building.

Notable former pupils

Sir Alexander Robert Badcock (1844–1907), army officer.
James Blunt, singer-songwriter.
Edwin Bramall, Baron Bramall (1923-2019), Field Marshal.
Sandy Wilson (1924–2014), songwriter-lyricist.
Christopher Bonham-Carter (1907–1975), naval officer.
Felix Cassel (1869–1953), lawyer.
Charles Montagu Doughty (1843–1926), poet, writer, and traveller.
Rookes Evelyn Bell Crompton (1845–1940), engineer.
Sebastian Faulks (b. 1953), novelist.
Walter George Headlam (1866–1908), classical scholar and poet.
J. Bruce Ismay (1862–1937), Managing Director of the White Star Line and survivor of the RMS Titanic.
Sir Philip Bennet Joubert de la Ferté (1887–1965), Royal Air Force Commander.
Archibald Campbell [Archie] MacLaren (1871–1944), cricketer.
John Whitehead (1860–1899), ornithologist and explorer.
George Ratcliffe Woodward (1848–1934), Anglican priest.
George Monbiot  (b. 1963), environmental activist and writer.

Notable teachers
William Bather (1861-1939), first-class cricketer, was assistant master at the school 1884-94.
Danyl Johnson, singer on Series 9 of The X-Factor; dance teacher
Frederic Meyrick-Jones (1867–1950), taught at the school from 1894–96
Edgar Stogdon (1870–1951), athlete and cricketer, was headmaster from 1900 to 1903.

Sports
During the autumn term, soccer is the main sport, along with hockey and tennis. During the Lent term, rugby takes over from soccer, and hockey and cross country running continue. During the summer term, cricket is the main school sport, with swimming, athletics, and tennis also popular throughout the term. The school's sports day is the focus of a pupil's summer term.

References

Bibliography
I. C. M. Sanderson, A history of Elstree School and three generations of the Sanderson family, Publ. Elstree School, 1978 (Privately Published)
John Eddison, A History of Elstree School, 1979 (mentioned in: Frances Wilson, How to Survive the Titanic Or The Sinking of J. Bruce Ismay, Chapter 3, Note 10)

External links
Elstree School web site

Preparatory schools in Berkshire
Educational institutions established in 1848
1848 establishments in England
Private schools in West Berkshire District
Woolhampton